Topic Studios is an American film production company owned by First Look Media. The company is known for producing films Leave No Trace (2018), Luce (2019), The Climb (2019),  The Mauritanian (2021). The company also produces television shows including Love Fraud (2020) and  100 Foot Wave (2021).

History
In June 2017, it was announced First Look Media would be launching a film and television production and distribution company Topic Studios. The company's first film was Roman J. Israel, Esq. directed by Dan Gilroy, starring Denzel Washington and released in November 2017, by Columbia Pictures.

In December 2020, Topic Studios signed a first look deal with The Population, a production company owned by Mynette Louie. In February 2021, Studios also signed a first look deal with Loveless Media.

Filmography

2010s

2020s

Upcoming

References

External links
 

Film production companies of the United States
Entertainment companies established in 2017
American companies established in 2017
American independent film studios